The most popular Latin pop songs in 2005, ranked by radio airplay audience impressions and measured by Nielsen BDS.

References

United States Latin Pop Airplay
2005
2005 in Latin music